Four Queens for an Ace (also known as An Ace and Four Queens) is a 1966 French-Spanish-Italian spy film, directed by Jacques Poitrenaud and starring Roger Hanin and Sylva Koscina. It is based on a novel by Michael Loggan.

Cast 

 Roger Hanin as Dan Layton 
 Sylva Koscina  as Dolorès
 Catherine Allégret as Marion
 Dominique Wilms as Petula
 Laura Valenzuela as  Rosaria
 François Maistre as Hakim Gregory
 Guy Delorme as Jésus
 Serge Gainsbourg as l'homme qui demande du feu

References

External links

French spy thriller films
Italian spy thriller films
Spanish spy thriller films
1960s spy thriller films
Films directed by Jacques Poitrenaud
Films based on French novels
Films with screenplays by Jean-Loup Dabadie
Films scored by Serge Gainsbourg
1960s French films
1960s Spanish films
1960s Italian films